Binghu Cave is a karst cave located some  from Jinhua City, Zhejiang Province, People's Republic of China.

Description
Access to the site is via a  flight of steps from the adjacent Shuanglong Cave. Together the two caves are known as the "Dragon's Ears" (龙耳/龍耳 Lóng Ĕr). Inside the cave there is a  waterfall whilst overhead there hangs a stalactite that is said to resemble Buddha's hand.

See also
 Shuanglong Cave

References

Caves of Zhejiang
Karst caves
Karst formations of China
Show caves in China
Tourist attractions in Zhejiang